Thomas Schumacher (born December 5, 1957) is a theatrical producer, currently president of Disney Theatrical Group, the theatrical production arm of The Walt Disney Company.

Life and career
Schumacher studied theatre at UCLA. In 1987 he was associate director of the Los Angeles Festival of Arts, presenting the American premiere of Cirque du Soleil and the English-language premiere of Peter Brook's The Mahabharata. Previously, he spent five years on staff at the Mark Taper Forum, served as a line producer on the 1984 Olympic Arts Festival, and served as assistant general manager of the Los Angeles Ballet. He then joined the Disney company in 1988, producing the animated film, The Rescuers Down Under, which was released in 1990.

With The Lion King under consideration for the next Broadway adaptation, Eisner ceded Disney Theatrical Productions to theatre-rooted Disney Animation president Peter Schneider and Schumacher, at their request, making them president and executive vice president of DTP, respectively. In 1994, Schumacher said that handing over the reins of the film to producer Don Hahn was painful. However, he was proud of the musical partnership between lyricist Tom Rice and singer Elton John whose songs "soar" through the film, although he was initially unsure of hiring John because he thought he was too big of a name. Schneider, through whom Schumacher got his job, described him as successful and arguing he has "great taste". Schumacher also said that he loathed saying there were gay characters because people will want him to "go backward and point them out". He further noted that Jeffrey Katzenberg asked if any of the gay references in the 1992 film Aladdin offended him, and he said the references were in "good fun", remarking that they should not deny that "swishy fashion designers" exist.

Schneider was promoted to Disney Studios president in January 1999, while Thomas Schumacher was promoted to president of Walt Disney Feature Animation and Walt Disney Theatrical Productions, while both are made co-presidents of Disney Theatrical which was renamed to Buena Vista Theatrical Group Limited with two divisions—Disney Theatricals and Hyperion Theatricals—head by the duo. With Schneider leaving in June 2001 to form his own theater production company partly funded by Disney, Schumacher became only president of Buena Vista Theatrical Group and head of its divisions.

After producing dozens of films, Schumacher left Walt Disney Feature Animation in 2002, replaced by David Stainton.

He transitioned to solely focus on the growing theatrical business as its head. He is a member of the board of trustees for Broadway Cares/Equity Fights AIDS,
 the Tony Administration Committee and the Advisory Committee of the American Theatre Wing. He is a mentor for the TDF Open Doors program and serves as an adjunct professor at Columbia University. In March 2016, the gala of the Theatre Development Fund saluted Schumacher and Disney Theatrical Productions. He also is the chairman of the Board of The Broadway League.

On February 21, 2018, The Wall Street Journal reported that Schumacher was the subject of an internal investigation at Disney into inappropriate behavior, with eyewitness accounts detailing aggressive sexual language and intimidation dating back to the 1990s. This reportedly included remarks toward male employees, including comments about the "sexual prowess of black men". It was also said that he denied the accusations and committed to being "more mindful and adhering to company policies going forward."

Schumacher has worked with The Walt Disney Company since 1988 and currently serves as President of Disney Theatrical Group.

Publications
Schumacher is the author of the book How Does the Show Go On? An Introduction to the Theater (Disney Editions, 2007; 2019).

Personal life
In June 1994, Schumacher told The Advocate that he was an "out gay man" when he began working at Disney, and argued there were "a lot of gay people at every level" of Disney, and called it a "very supportive environment", with The Advocate calling him one of the "most influential gay men" in Hollywood. He also brought his partner, Matthew White, a ballet dancer in Los Angeles, to the annual company party and other company retreats. He noted that while some were "uncomfortable" with Schumacher bringing his partner, that higher executives like Jeffrey Katzenberg and Michael Eisner did not trouble him over it.

In November 2012, Schumacher married White, his longtime partner and interior designer.

References

External links
 
How Does the Show Go On? – Official website

Living people
American chief executives in the media industry
University of California, Los Angeles alumni
People from Glendale, California
Walt Disney Theatrical
Disney executives
Disney people
LGBT producers
1958 births